Emmanuel Yaw Donkor (born 13 January 1994) is a Ghanaian badminton player. He competed at the 2014 and 2018 Commonwealth Games. In 2016, he was the runner-up at the Rose Hill International tournament in the mixed doubles event partnered with Gifty Mensah. Teamed-up with Stella Amasah, they were the finalist at the 2017 Benin International tournament. He and Amasah also the semi-finalist at the Ivory Coast International tournament. He educated at the University of Cape Coast.

Achievements

BWF International Challenge/Series
Mixed doubles

 BWF International Challenge tournament
 BWF International Series tournament
 BWF Future Series tournament

References

External links
 

1994 births
Living people
People from Sekondi-Takoradi
Ghanaian male badminton players
Badminton players at the 2014 Commonwealth Games
Badminton players at the 2018 Commonwealth Games
Commonwealth Games competitors for Ghana
Competitors at the 2015 African Games
African Games competitors for Ghana